恒大 may refer to:
Evergrande Group, a property developer in China
Guangzhou Evergrande Taobao F.C., a football club in China
Hang Seng University of Hong Kong, a university in Hong Kong commonly abbreviated as